"The Garden" is a song by British group Take That. It was released on 20 March 2009 as the third single from their fifth studio album, The Circus.

Song information
Mark Owen originally intended to sing the song's bridge during its writing and recording, but was surprised and impressed when Howard Donald sang it instead, which was kept in the final recording.

The song's B-side is "84", the same B-side of their preceding single "Up All Night", and is sung by Jason Orange.

Promotion
The band performed "The Garden" on BBC's Comic Relief show on 13 March 2009. The song has been performed on Mooi! Weer De Leeuw in the Netherlands on 14 March 2009. The song was then performed on Swiss television on the show Music Stars on 15 March 2009. The group then made an appearance on the Italian version of The X Factor on 17 March 2009. The band also performed the song on German TV show Wetten, dass..? on 21 March 2009. The band then performed the track at the final of The X Factor (Denmark) on 27 March 2009.

Critical reception

Digital Spy commented: "'The Garden' is a stunning, string-laden epic with a chorus so massive it requires a marching brass band for backing." The Sunday Times described the song as "propulsive and swollen with a giant chorus."

Music video
The video for "The Garden" debuted on 21 March 2009, with all members singing lead vocals. The video for the song was shot at the Greenwich Maritime Museum, South London. The video is black and white and shows the band dressed in black performing the song. The video is interspersed with blurred images of people going about their daily lives. In the official Take That book Take Two the band express their dislike for the video, claiming that it worked with still images but as a music video, it did not work.

Release
A physical version of the single was released in Europe. The single was available on two CDs, both containing the same track listing; however a Limited Edition CD2, housed in a large jewel case, contained an exclusive foam car sticker of the TT logo, with 'The Garden' written underneath.

Personnel
Gary Barlow – co-lead vocals
Howard Donald – co-lead vocals, backing vocals
Jason Orange – co-lead vocals, backing vocals
Mark Owen – co-lead vocals, backing vocals

Track listings
 "The Garden" (radio edit) – 3:22
 "84" – 3:11

Charts

References

Take That songs
2009 singles
Pop ballads
Songs written by Gary Barlow
Songs written by Mark Owen
Songs written by Jason Orange
Songs written by Howard Donald
2008 songs
Songs written by Jamie Norton
Songs written by Ben Mark